According to some Christian traditions, a second work of grace (also second blessing) is a transforming interaction with God which may occur in the  life of an individual Christian. The defining characteristics of the second work of grace are that it is separate from and subsequent to the New Birth (the first work of grace), and that it brings about significant changes in the life of the  believer.

Methodism (inclusive of the holiness movement) 

John Wesley, the founder of the Methodist movement, taught that there were two distinct phases in the Christian experience. In the first work of grace, the new birth, the believer received forgiveness and became a Christian. During the second work of grace, entire sanctification, the believer was purified and made holy. Wesley taught both that entire sanctification could be an instantaneous experience, and that it could be the result of a gradual process. Entire sanctification removes original sin and that those who experience it do not experience internal temptation to commit sin proper; the free will to backslide into sin and commit apostasy, however, exists (cf. conditional preservation of the saints), and on sin after entire sanctification, Churches upholding Methodist theology teach:

 
After Wesley's death, mainstream Methodism "emphasized sanctification or holiness as the goal of the Christian life", something that "may be received in this life both gradually and instantaneously, and should be sought earnestly by every child of God." Before a believer is entirely sanctified, he/she consecrates himself/herself to God; the theology behind consecration is summarized with the maxim "Give yourself to God in all things, if you would have God give Himself to you."

The Holiness movement emerged in the 1860s with the desire to re-emphasize Wesley's sanctification doctrine. Many Holiness preachers taught that sanctification was an instantaneous experience. In the Holiness movement, the second work of grace is considered to be a cleansing from the tendency to commit sin, an experience called entire sanctification which leads to Christian perfection. The Core Values of the Bible Methodist Connection of Churches thus teaches that:

Still, many within holiness movement (often those within the same denomination, such as the Free Methodist Church) emphasized that before a person could be entirely sanctified, they must put to death the carnal nature through a process of renunciation; this is known as the 'death route to entire sanctification' (cf. ). Though the belief in the death route to Christian perfection is held by many throughout Methodism, it is especially emphasized in the Emmanuel Association of Churches and the Immanuel Missionary Church.

Keswickian theology 
Keswickian theology teaches a second work of grace that occurs through "surrender and faith", in which God keeps an individual from sin. Keswickian denominations, such as the Christian and Missionary Alliance, differ from the Wesleyan-Holiness movement in that the Christian and Missionary Alliance does not see entire sanctification as cleansing one from original sin, whereas holiness denominations espousing the Wesleyan-Arminian theology affirm this belief.

Holiness Pentecostalism
Holiness Pentecostalism was born out of a Wesleyan-Arminian theological background. William J. Seymour and Charles Fox Parham were both Holiness ministers and were seen by their followers as being used by God to restore Pentecost to the Church. Holiness Pentecostalism, inclusive of denominations such as the Apostolic Faith Church, teaches that the believer could, in addition to becoming sanctified, receive power from God and the gifts of the Holy Spirit. In early Pentecostal thought (known as Holiness Pentecostalism), this was considered the third work of grace that followed the new birth (first work of grace) and entire sanctification (second work of grace). 

Pentecostals who believe in the doctrine of Finished Work, however, reject the second work of grace to mean entire sanctification.

See also 

First work of grace (in Methodist and Holiness Christianity) 
Third work of grace (in Pentecostalism)

References

Further reading

Stetler II, Darrell (2020). Holiness is Able to Be Perfected or Completed. Published by NewStart Discipleship.

External links 
 Sermon 40: "Christian Perfection" by John Wesley (United Methodist Church)
How to be Entirely Sanctified by Dr. Allan Brown (God's Bible School and College)
Scriptural Death-Route Holiness by Rev. L.S. Boardman (Wesleyan Heritage Library)
Entire Sanctification - Darrell Stetler II Ministries

Methodism
Holiness movement
Christian terminology